Space Corps, may refer to:

Space force, a military branch of a country's armed forces
Space Corps (comics), the outer-space arm of the Mega-City One Judges
United States Space Corps, a proposed name for the U.S. Space Force

See also
 Space Force (disambiguation)
 Space Command (disambiguation)